The Lartigue Monorail system was developed by the French engineer Charles Lartigue (1834–1907). He further developed a horse drawn monorail system, which had been invented by Henry Robinson Palmer in 1821.

Lartigue had seen camels in Algeria carrying heavy loads balanced in panniers on their backs. This inspired him to design a new type of railway. Instead of the conventional two parallel rails on the ground, it had a single rail sitting above the sand and held at waist height on A-shaped trestles. The carriages sat astride the trestles like panniers.

However this line never opened after it failed certification testing in both 1895 and 1896. The track and equipment were scrapped in 1902.

The most famous Lartigue railway was the Listowel and Ballybunion Railway in Ireland which ran for 36 years from 1888.

By 1881 Lartigue had also built a  monorail to transport esparto grass across the Algerian desert, with mules pulling trains of panniers that straddled the elevated rail.

However the Lartigue system as built was not truly a monorail, since it was necessary to add two further rails, one on each side, lower down the A frames.  These did not carry any weight, but unpowered stabilising wheels fitted to all the engines and wagons contacted these extra rails to prevent the vehicles from overbalancing.

Listowel and Ballybunion Railway

This was a  monorail built on the Lartigue principle in County Kerry in Ireland. It linked Ballybunion with the North Kerry line at Listowel. It had one intermediate station and a passing loop at Lisselton. The line ran beside the main Listowel/Ballybunion road (R553). It officially opened on 29 February 1888, public services beginning on 5 March.  The track was prefabricated and easily erected, and the capital cost was £33,000, far lower than a conventional railway. No baronial guarantees were sought. However, the system had significant operating drawbacks.

Loads had to be evenly balanced. If a farmer wanted to send a cow to market, he would have to send two calves to balance it, which would travel back on opposite sides of the same freight wagon, thereby balancing each other.

Another problem with using the Lartigue system in populated areas was that, due to the track's design, it was not possible to build conventional level crossings. In order for a road to cross the track, a kind of double-sided drawbridge had to be constructed, which required an attendant to operate it.  Where farmers' tracks crossed the line there were level crossings based on the principle of a turntable.  These were locked and the farmer in question provided with a key.  Once unlocked, the track could be swivelled to one side to allow the crossing to be used.  Both the swivelling and drawbridge type crossings were automatically linked to signals, which stopped any approaching trains; road traffic was always given priority under this system.

Passengers could not pass from one side of a carriage to another while in motion.  A kind of footbridge was built into one end of some of the passenger coaches, while at least one such bridge was carried on a separate wagon.  This allowed passengers to cross from one side of the train to the other when stopped at a station.

Conventional railway points could not be used, so a similar function was fulfilled by a large number of curved movable pieces of track which, when rotated one way, would connect the main and one other track. When turned end-for-end, the curve went in the opposite direction, and so connected the main and a different track. The devices could not be called turntables because they could only be moved when there was no rolling stock on them. There was, however, a turntable at each terminus.

The three locomotives were of the 0-3-0 type, constructed by the Hunslet Engine Company. They were specially built with two boilers to balance on the track, and consequently two fireboxes, one of which had to be stoked by the driver. They were also fitted with powered tenders for auxiliary use on hills.  The tender wheels were driven by two cylinders via spur gears.  Two small chimneys were fitted to each tender to discharge the exhaust steam from these cylinders. A smaller engine, nicknamed the "coffee pot", was used in the construction of the railway, having been used previously on a demonstration line at Tothill Fields in London. It can be seen on an early photo of 1888. The rolling stock, both wagons and carriages, were made by the Falcon Engine & Car Works of Loughborough.

The track, installations and rolling stock were damaged during the Irish Civil War of 1922/23, but services continued.  However, the failure to include the railway in the Great Southern Railways, the company created by the Irish Government to run the railways in the Irish Free State, left the financially struggling operation no choice but to close.   The last train ran on 14 October 1924 and everything was scrapped, except a short section of the track.

Accidents 
On 29 September 1889, a passenger train was derailed near Galey bridge, probably as a result of sabotage to the line. Several bolts were found to have been removed from the track and discarded some distance away.  Fortunately no-one was injured.

On 28 November 1907, a double-headed train on a busy race day collided with some sleepers on a trestle and derailed.

Restoration

In 2003 the Lartigue Monorailway Restoration Committee, a voluntary organisation from Listowel, opened a  section of Lartigue monorail on the trackbed of the former North Kerry line in Listowel. Visitors to the site Lartigue Monorail and Museum can take a demonstration monorail trip and learn about the history of the Lartigue Monorail. The line is worked by a diesel locomotive built to resemble the original 0-3-0 steam engines.  The locomotive and its train of replica coaches were built by Alan Keef Ltd.

Other examples
The Centennial Monorail at the Centennial Exposition of 1876 in Philadelphia was a full-sized, but short (155m. long track) demonstration of a steam-powered, passenger-carrying Lartigue monorail.

The Bradford and Foster Brook Railway in McKean County, Pennsylvania, inspired by the Centennial Monorail, was built in 1878 to serve the Pennsylvania oil boom, but operated for less than a year.

In the northern Mojave desert of California, the Epsom Salts Monorail was built in 1924. This non-passenger monorail achieved gradients of more than ten percent. It only operated until June 1926,  and was dismantled for scrap in the late 1930s.

See also
 List of heritage railways in the Republic of Ireland
 History of rail transport in Ireland
 Aldershot Narrow Gauge Suspension Railway

References

Further reading

External links

The Rebuilt Lartigue Monorailway website

The Lartigue Monorailway Photos
Article in the Scientific American Supplement No. 584 (12 March 1887) pages 9325-27
British Pathe film

Heritage railways in the Republic of Ireland
Rail transport in Ireland
Monorails